Wijnen or Wynen is a Dutch patronymic surname. The given name Wijn is a now rare short form of names like Boudewijn and Wijnand. The patronym has a large number of variants, including Weijnen, Wienen, Wijn, Wijne, Wijns, Wynen, and Wyns. The name Van Wijnen is possibly a toponymic surname instead, indicating an origin in Wijnen, either a former hamlet near Nistelrode in North Brabant or a Dutch name for the town Guînes in Northern France. People with these names include:

Wijnen/Wynen
Alphons Wijnen (1921–2001), Dutch East Indies Army officer
 (1923–2007), Belgian physician and World War II resistance fighter
Arrienne Wynen (born 1955), Australian lawn bowler
Martin Wijnen (born 1966), Dutch Vice Chief of Defence
Tiemen Wijnen (born 2000), Belgian football player

Wienen
Jos Wienen (born 1960), Dutch politician, mayor of Haarlem

Wijn
Jan Wijn (born 1934), Dutch pianist and piano pedagogue
Joop Wijn (born 1969), Dutch politician, Minister of Economic Affairs 2006–2007
Piet Wijn (1929–2010), Dutch comics creator
Sander de Wijn (born 1990), Dutch field hockey player

Wijns/Wyns
David Wijns (born 1987), Belgian football defender
François-Jean Wyns de Raucour (1779–1857), Belgian liberal politician, burgomaster of Brussels
Lode Wyns (born c.1950), Belgian molecular biologist
Lode Wyns (athlete) (born 1946), Belgian javelin thrower

Van Wijnen
Bas van Wijnen (born 1997), Dutch football midfielder
Domenicus van Wijnen (1661–1695), Dutch allegorical painter
Hans van Wijnen (1937–1995), Dutch volleyball player

See also
Wijnants, related patronymic surname

References

Dutch-language surnames
Patronymic surnames